Neoserixia pulchra is a species of beetle in the family Cerambycidae. It was described by Bernhard Schwarzer in 1925.

References

Saperdini
Beetles described in 1925